Melmoil is a small village in Vellore district near K.V.Kuppam.

Villages in Vellore district